San Patricio is an album by the Irish musical group, The Chieftains featuring Ry Cooder, released in 2010. It was their first album with Hear Music and the first studio album in over six years since Further Down the Old Plank Road (2003). It tells the story of the San Patricio battalion—a group of mainly Irish immigrant volunteer soldiers who deserted the U.S. Army in 1846 to fight on the Mexican side in the Mexican–American War (1846–1848). The album features collaborations with Moya Brennan, Linda Ronstadt (in what remains her most recent commercial recording), Liam Neeson, Los Cenzontles, Los Tigres del Norte, Lila Downs, Van Dyke Parks, Carlos Núñez, and Chavela Vargas (among others). The album artist is El Moisés.

Track listing
 "La Iguana" (Traditional, arr. Paddy Moloney, L. Downs) – 3:34 (with Lila Downs)
 "La Golondrina" (Traditional, arr. P. Moloney, Los Folkloristas) – 3:08 (with Los Folkloristas)
 "A la Orilla de un Palmar" (Traditional, arr. L. Ronstadt) – 3:32 (with Linda Ronstadt)
 "Danza de Concheros" (Traditional, arr. P. Moloney, Los Folkloristas) – 1:29 (with Los Folkloristas)
 "El Chivo" (Traditional, arr. Julian Gonzalez) – 2:05 (with Los Cenzontles)
 "San Campio" (P. Moloney) – 2:45 (with Carlos Núñez)
 "The Sands of Mexico" (R. Cooder) – 4:47 (with Ry Cooder)
 "Sailing to Mexico" (P. Moloney) – 2:00 (with Carlos Núñez)
 "El Caballo" (Traditional, arr. Los Camperos de Valles, P. Moloney) – 2:40 (with Los Camperos de Valles)
 "March to Battle (Across the Rio Grande)" (Music: P. Moloney, lyric: Brendan Graham) – 4:10 (with Banda de Gaita de Batallón de San Patricio, Liam Neeson, Los Cenzontles, L.A. Juvenil)
 "Lullaby for the Dead" (Music: P. Moloney, lyric: Brendan Graham) – 4:36 (with Moya Brennan)
 "Luz de Luna" (Álvaro Carrillo) – 3:30 (with Chavela Vargas)
 "Persecución de Villa" (Samuel Margarito Lozano) – 2:55 (with Mariachi Santa Fe de Jesus (Chuy) Guzman)
 "Canción Mixteca (Intro)" (Jose Lopez Alavez) – 2:54 (with Ry Cooder, Van Dyke Parks)
 "Canción Mixteca" (Jose Lopez Alavez) – 3:14 (with Los Tigres del Norte)
 "Ojitos Negros" (Traditional, arr. Eugene Rodriguez) – 2:24 (with Los Cenzontles)
 "El Relampago" (Traditional, arr. P. Moloney, L. Downs) – 3:15 (with Lila Downs)
 "El Pájaro Cu" (Traditional, arr. La Negra Graciana, P. Moloney)– 2:35 (with La Negra Graciana)
 "Finale" (Traditional, arr. P. Moloney) – 5:46 (with Los Cenzontles, Carlos Núñez, Los Folkloristas, Banda de Gaita de Batallón de San Patricio, L.A. Juvenil)

Bonus Disc – DVD (Deluxe Edition only)
 "The Making of San Patricio"
 "La Iguana" (with Lila Downs)
 "Canción Mixteca" (with Los Tigres del Norte)
 "Luz de Luna" (with Chavela Vargas)

Personnel
in alphabetical order 

 Olga Alanis – percussion
 Juan Carlos Allende – guitar
 Sergio Alonso – harp
 Pancho Alvarez – bouzouki
 Stephen Armstrong – assistant engineer
 Hugo Arroyo – tuba, vocals, guitarron, quijada
 Ersi Arvizu – vocals
 Jose Avila – percussion
 Marisa Bautista – vocals
 Moya Brennan – vocals
 Jorge López Calderón – drums (snare)
 Rene Camacho – bass, bass (upright)
 Edmar Castaneda – harp, cuatro
 Gabriel Castañón – assistant engineer
 Paul Cohen – vocals
 Larissa Collins – art direction, package design
 Kevin Conneff – bodhrán, lilting
 Ry Cooder – guitar, piano, composer, timbales, vocals, producer, laud
 Raúl Cuellar – violin
 Robert Curto – accordion
 Lila Downs – vocals, arranger, step dancing
 Ernesto Villalobos – fiddle, jarana, vocals
 Celso Duarte – fiddle, harp, vocals
 Mary Farquharson – coordination, research
 Raúl Durrand Flores – assistant engineer
 Sofia Fojas – violin
 Arturo Gallardo – clarinet
 Julian Gonzalez – violin, arranger

 Bernie Grundman – mastering
 Jesus "Chuy" Guzman – violin
 Carlos Henderson – bass
 Camilo Ramirez Hernandez – violin
 Eduardo Hernández – bass (electric), vocals, bass (acoustic)
 Hernán Hernández – bass (electric), vocals
 Hugo Hernandez – drums (bass)
 Jorgé Hernández – accordion, vocals
 Luis Hernández – accordion, vocals, bajo sexto
 Marcos Hernandez – vocals, huapanguera
 Ubaldo Hernandez – trumpet
 Juancho Herrera – guitar, vocals
 Don Hoffman – engineer
 Daniel García Hughes – drums (snare)
 Juan Jimenez – guitarron
 Jimmy Cuellar – violin
 Guadalupe Jolicoeur – coordination, art direction, research
 Seán Keane – fiddle
 Oscar Lara – drums
 Jeffrey Lesser – engineer
 Germán López – vihuela
 Steve Macklam – art direction
 Mariachi Santa Fe De Jesus (Chuy) Guzman – vocals
 Tríona Marshall – harp
 Neil Martin – cello
 Brian Masterson – engineer, mixing
 Bart Migal – assistant engineer, associate engineer

 Matt Molloy – flute
 Paddy Moloney – arranger, composer, producer, liner notes, uilleann pipes, tin whistle, mixing, tin cans
 Rogelio Navarrate – clarinet
 Liam Neeson – narrator
 Niamh Ní Charra – concertina
 Adrian Nieto – mandolin, percussion
 Carlos Núñez – gaita, low whistle
 Xurxo Nunez – drums, guitar (electric), engineer
 Felipe Ochoa – vocals, requinto
 Marco Ochoa – vocals, jarana
 Van Dyke Parks – piano, accordion
 Miguel Pena – guitar
 Jon Pilatzke – fiddle, step dancing
 Martin Pradler – engineer
 Mike Riley – assistant engineer
 Alberto J. Rodríguez – assistant engineer
 Eugene Rodriguez – vihuela, arranger
 Gabriela Rodriguez – Percussion
 Javier Rodriguez – trumpet
 Juan Rodríguez – violin
 Luciana Rodriguez – vocals
 Albert J. Roman – design assistant
 Linda Ronstadt – vocals, arranger
 Yayo Serka – cajon
 Graciana Silva – harp, vocals
 Gregorio Solano – vocals, jarana
 Samuel Torres – conga, maracas, cajon
 Fabiola Truijillo – vocals
 Omar Valdez – percussion
 Chavela Vargas – vocals
 Efrén Vargas – mandolin, percussion
 Rodolfo Vazquez – engineer, field recording

Charts

Weekly charts

Year-end charts

See also
 List of number-one Billboard Latin Albums from the 2010s

External links
 The Chieftains official website – official website

References

2010 albums
The Chieftains albums
Ry Cooder albums
Collaborative albums
Albums produced by Ry Cooder
Hear Music albums